Mnarolitia paulianellum is a moth in the family Xyloryctidae. It was described by Viette in 1954. It is found in Madagascar.

References

Mnarolitia
Moths described in 1954